In 2004, news reports emerged that China was developing a new "IPv9" technology to replace the existing Internet Protocol. This appears to have been a proposal to link Internet addressing with Chinese 10-digit telephone numbers. The protocol was a research project of the Institute of Chemical Engineering (Shanghai), and there was little evidence that it gained any real-world adoption.

A small number of papers and patents have been published which refer to IPv9 addressing. Proponents of the scheme say that it promotes digital sovereignty, and is superior to IPv6 in that it will allow every living cell to be assigned its own IPv9 address.

References

See also 
 .chn, an alternative DNS root proposal
 Telephone numbers in China
 New IP

Internet protocols
Internet in China